Hafiz Khalid Mahmood (born 12 October 1976) is a Pakistani former cricketer. He played in 90 first-class and 62 List A matches between 1997 and 2008. He made his Twenty20 debut on 26 April 2005, for Sialkot Stallions in the 2004–05 National Twenty20 Cup.

References

External links
 

1976 births
Living people
Pakistani cricketers
Gujranwala cricketers
Khan Research Laboratories cricketers
Sialkot cricketers
Sialkot Stallions cricketers
Cricketers from Gujranwala